The Santa Fe derby (Clásico Santafesino in Spanish) is one of the most fiercely contested derbies in Argentine football. It is played between local clubs Colón and Unión.

Colón play their home games at the Estadio Brigadier General Estanislao López, while Unión play their home games at Estadio 15 de Abril.

Summary of results
As of 9 Dec 2020; only official matches are included

Notes

References

Argentine football rivalries
Football clubs in Santa Fe Province
Club Atlético Colón
CA Unión